is a Japanese actress and voice actress from Fukushima Prefecture, Japan. She is affiliated with Air Agency.

Filmography

Anime
2010
A Certain Scientific Railgun as Sightseer (ep 20)
Kakko Kawaii Sengen as Narrator
2011
Beelzebub as Sachura
Ben-To as Nurse B (ep 8); Pharmacist (ep 11)
Kakko Kawaii Sengen Season 2 as Narration
Wandering Son as Saori's Mother; female teacher; girl B (11)
2012
AKB0048 as Mother (ep 6)
Beelzebub as Female Student B (ep 54)
Black Rock Shooter as Female Student (ep 3); Junior (ep 4)
Lagrange: The Flower of Rin-ne as Rui Senzai (ep 9)
Shirokuma Cafe as High schooler
Waiting in the Summer as Teacher B (ep 1)
2013
A Town Where You Live
Odoriko Clinoppe as Rival-chan
Red Data Girl as Mikoto Kanzaki
Valvrave the Liberator Season 2 as Student (ep 16)
2014
47 Todōfuken R as Fukushima Dog
Pocket Monsters: XY as Shauna/Sana
The Seven Deadly Sins as Cenette
Tokyo Ghoul as Kimi Nishino; Woman on the street (ep 7); Newscaster (ep 9); Haru (ep 11); Kaneki (child; ep 12)
World Trigger as Futatsugi; Citizen (ep 5)
Yo-Kai Watch as Shiori Nakamura; Fortune-teller; woman
2015
Gate: Jieitai Kano Chi nite, Kaku Tatakaeri as Female University Student (ep 10)
Tokyo Ghoul √A as Kimi Nishino (ep 8); Ruisawa (ep 7)
World Trigger as Mira; Newbie team member (ep 17); Announcer (eps 19-20); Reporter (ep 37)
2016
Kabaneri of the Iron Fortress as Shigeo (ep 5)
Pocket Monsters: XY&Z as Shauna/Sana
World Trigger as Hikari Nire
Yo-Kai Watch as Koichi
2017
Chaos;Child as Female Teacher
Crayon Shin-chan as Female clerk, lady in line
2018
Tokyo Ghoul:re Second Season as Kimi Nishino
Yo-Kai Watch Shadowside as Azusa, Izumi, Schoolgirl A, Girl, Hinako
2019
GeGeGe no Kitarō (6th Season) as Kiyomi Kanai (ep 45)
Hulaing Babies as Kohara-sensei
2020
Uchitama?! Have you seen my Tama? as onee-san

OVA
2014
Kuroko's Basketball 41.5 
Yondemasuyo, Azazel-san

Anime Film
2012
Kappa no Suribachi as Matahachi
2014
Yo-Kai Watch: Tanjō no Himitsu da Nyan!

Drama CD
2011
Hanasaku Iroha Drama CD ~after days~ as Misaki, child
My Little Monster as Saeko-Senpai
2012
Taiyō no Ie as Mrs. Motomiya
2014
Sherlock Holmes as Mary Sutherland
2015
5-ji Kara 9-ji Made as Momoe Yamabuchi

Live Action Film
2010
Wonderful World as Bentō vendor
Nichijou End as Miyuki
2013
Death & Tanya as Miyuki Taniya
2017
Tokidoki Meguri Everyday

Video games
2008
 Akai Ito DS ~Destiny~
2010
 Uragiri wa Boku no Namae wo Shitteiru -Tasogare ni ochita inori- as College student, lecturer
 Class of Heroes 2G as Fran
2011
 A Certain Scientific Railgun as Sanctions guide
 Mōjūdzukai to ōji-sama ~Snow Bride~
2013
 Hissatsu Shigotonin ~Oshioki Collection~ as Makoto Fuefuki
2014
 Heroes Placement as Himawari Minamisōma
2015
 Uchi no Hime-sama ga Ichiban Kawaii as Perisha Blue

Commercial
2008
 Mitsubishi Electric Building Techno-Service
 American Home Assurance Company
Unknown date
 Shueisha "Super Dash & Go!" (Narration)
 Kakkokawaii Sengen! (Narration)

Overseas Dubbing
2015
 Ribbit as Sandy
Unknown date
 Chained

Voice Over
2011
Future Century Zipangu

Webcomic
+Voice
2007
Musashino-sen no Shimai as Shizuru Munakata
2008
Hitomi no Photograph as Yui Ichinomiya

Other
 Little Wonders: Sneeze as Arthur

References

External links
 Official agency profile 
 
 

Living people
Actors from Fukushima Prefecture
Japanese stage actresses
Japanese video game actresses
Japanese voice actresses
Tokyo Actor's Consumer's Cooperative Society voice actors
Voice actresses from Fukushima Prefecture
21st-century Japanese actresses
1983 births